Rated A for Awesome is a Canadian animated television series created by Austin Petten.It premiered on YTV on September 3, 2011, and ended on February 25, 2012. Rated A for Awesome also aired on Disney XD in United States. The series was produced by the Canadian animation studio Nerd Corps Entertainment

Premise
Four 12-year-old kids and a pet monkey attempt to make the world awesome by awesomizing everything boring, including the world's dullest teacher and detention.

Characters

Main
 Lester "Les" Awesome (voiced by Samuel Vincent) is the leader, and the shortest of the team. He is the only one in his family who does not have a trophy until he was rewarded for saving someone's life. His catchphrase is, "Time to awesomize!" in the intro. Les is Thera's step brother and he hates the last day of summer break and the countryside. Les has blue hair, blue eyes, he has a tan and he wears a stripey blue T-shirt and jeans. He is also not very good at singing and dancing.
 Noam Plinsky (voiced by Brian Drummond) is a tall young man. He is an inventor who can operate anything. He also plays guitar and drums a lot and is very good at it. He gets mostly stage fright and hates being stared at. Like Les and Thera, Noam wears only one type of colour. He has green hair, green eyes, green glasses, a green shirt (with sleeves) with a computer power button symbol on it, he also wears green shoes and jeans. He has a crush on Thera but keeps it secret from the rest of the team. In "Thera's Date With Destiny" it is shown that he will be her Future prom date. When he shows sign of liking Thera he just screams and runs away, or gets extremely embarrassed, blushes, and attempts to change the subject.
 Lars Arnst (voiced by Colin Murdock) is the fattest and craziest member. He has a Nordic accent. He is a great singer and actor and spent time in the school Glee Club. But his teacher fired him in "Lester's Song of Doom". Lars wears a red hoodie, blue jeans and red trainers, plus he has blonde hair and blue eyes.
Thera Kerplopolis (voiced by Chiara Zanni), as named by Principal in "Club Detention", sometimes mistakenly called Thera Awesome, is cute and athletic. She is ready for action and never gives up. Sometimes she has a little bit of a temper when it comes to rivals. She likes taking on risky tasks. She is also Les' stepsister and had a crush on Ned Falcon in "Awesome Ride", but now seems to be falling for Noam. Thera has purple hair with a pink-purple coloured fringe, and she wears a pink t-shirt and purple trousers. 
 Mr. Twitchy (voiced by Tabitha St. Germain) is an amazing smart pet monkey who is always wearing a blonde wig. His catchphrase is "ha cha cha!"

Recurring

Parents 

 Max Awesome (voiced by Brian Dobson), father of Lester
 Angelina (voiced by Kathleen Barr), wife of Max and mother of Thera

Teachers 

 Miss Dullmeister, music teacher
 Mister Fadenjeans, teacher of others
 Mister Noddenoff, teacher of Les

Episodes

References

2011 Canadian television series debuts
2012 Canadian television series endings
2010s Canadian animated television series
Canadian children's animated comedy television series
Canadian computer-animated television series
English-language television shows
YTV (Canadian TV channel) original programming
Television series by Corus Entertainment
Television series by DHX Media
Television shows set in British Columbia
Television shows filmed in Vancouver
Animated television series about children
Animated television series about monkeys